Tasby is a surname. Notable people with the surname include: 

 Finis Tasby (1939–2014), American blues singer
 Willie Tasby (1933–2022), American baseball player